Strike rate refers to two different statistics in the sport of cricket. Batting strike rate is a measure of how quickly a batter achieves the primary goal of batting, namely scoring runs, measured in runs per 100 balls; higher is better. Bowling strike rate is a measure of how quickly a bowler achieves the primary goal of bowling, namely taking wickets (i.e. getting batters out)measured in balls per wicket; lower is better. For bowlers, economy rate is a more frequently discussed statistic.

Both strike rates are relatively new statistics, having only been invented and considered of importance after the introduction of One Day International cricket in the 1970s.

Batting strike rate

Batting strike rate (s/r) is defined for a batter as the average number of runs scored per 100 balls faced. The higher the strike rate, the more effective a batter is at scoring quickly.

In Test cricket, a batter's strike rate is of secondary importance  to ability to score runs without getting out. This means a Test batter's most important statistic is generally considered to be batting average, rather than strike rate.

In limited overs cricket, strike rates are of considerably more importance. Since each team only faces a limited number of balls in an innings, the faster a batter scores, the more runs the team will be able to accumulate. Strike rates of over 150 are becoming common in Twenty20 cricket. Strike rate is probably considered by most as the key factor in a batter in one day cricket. Accordingly, the batters with higher strike rates, especially in Twenty20 matches, are more valued than those with a lesser strike rate. Strike rate is also used to compare a batter’s ability to score runs against differing forms of bowling (eg spin bowling, fast bowling), often giving an indication to the bowling team as to how successfully to limit a batter's ability to score.

Highest career strike rate (T20I)

Highest career strike rate (ODI)

Bowling strike rate
Bowling strike rate is defined for a bowler as the average number of balls bowled per wicket taken. The lower the strike rate, the more effective a bowler is at taking wickets quickly.

Although introduced as a statistic complementary to the batting strike rate during the ascension of one-day cricket in the 1980s, bowling strike rates are arguably of more importance in Test cricket than One-day Internationals. This is because the primary goal of a bowler in Test cricket is to take wickets, whereas in a one-day match it is often sufficient to bowl economically - giving away as few runs as possible even if this means taking fewer wickets.

Best career strike rate (ODI and T20I)

Best career strike rate (Tests)

References

Cricket terminology
Cricket records and statistics
Rates